VHB may refer to:

 Vanasse Hangen Brustlin, Inc., an American civil engineering firm
 Vereinigte Huttwil-Bahnen, one of three Swiss railways that merged in 1997 to form Regionalverkehr Mittelland
 Verkehrsverbund Hegau-Bodensee, a German transport association
 Verlagsgruppe Handelsblatt, publisher of the German business newspaper Handelsblatt
 Virtual Haptic Back, a haptic technology in medicine
 VHb (hemoglobin), found in the bacterium Vitreoscilla
 VHB monitor, or very high brightness monitor, a type of computer monitor
 VHB, a vehicle registration plate prefix for vehicles for hire in Victoria, Australia
 The VHB, a performer on the 1984 compilation album Street Sounds Electro 4
 VHB tape, a trademarked family of acrylic-adhesive double-sided tapes made by 3M